The Endless Game is a two-part television miniseries that premiered on Channel 4 in the United Kingdom on 20 August 1989 before eventually appearing on Showtime in the United States in 1990. An espionage thriller based on a novel by filmmaker Bryan Forbes, it was also written and directed by Forbes. It starred Albert Finney and George Segal in leading roles, as a British spy and his rival, respectively. Kristin Scott Thomas, Ian Holm, and John Standing also played supporting roles. The musical score was composed by Ennio Morricone.

Cast
Albert Finney... Alec Hillsden
George Segal... Mr. Miller
Monica Guerritore... Silvia
Ian Holm... Control
Kristin Scott Thomas... Caroline
John Standing... Belfrage

References

External links

1980s British television miniseries
1989 British television series debuts
1989 British television series endings
1980s British drama television series
1980s British mystery television series
British thriller television series
Channel 4 television dramas
Channel 4 miniseries
Television shows produced by Television South (TVS)
Showtime (TV network) films
English-language television shows